Jérémy Morel (born 2 April 1984) is a professional footballer who plays as a centre-back for Montagnarde. Born in France, he opted to represent the Madagascar national team internationally.

Club career

Lorient
Born in Lorient, Morel made his senior debut for FC Lorient at the age of 19, coming on as a substitute for Pape Malick Diop in Lorient's Ligue 2 1–0 defeat at home to FC Gueugnon on 19 April 2003. He played only one other match (a Ligue 2 match) in the 2002–03 season. In the next three seasons, he progressively played more matches for Lorient. Morel played 28 matches in Lorient's 2005–06 Ligue 2 season in which Lorient finished in third position; they were thus promoted to Ligue 1 for the 2006–07 season.

Marseille
On 19 June 2011, Morel ended his nine-year senior spell with Lorient to join Ligue 1 club Olympique de Marseille, signing a contract that would last until 30 June 2015.

Lyon
On 1 June 2015, Morel Joined Olympique Lyonnais on a three-year contract.

On 13 April 2017, Morel pinched the ball from goalkeeper Fabri in the penalty area and tapped it into an empty net in the 84th minute for the final goal of Lyon's 2–1 home 2016–17 UEFA Europa League quarterfinal first-leg win against Beşiktaş; it was his first career competitive goal for Lyon and the first UEFA club competition goal of his club career, coming in his 33rd UEFA club competition match, having played 23 matches in the UEFA Champions League and 10 matches in the UEFA Europa League for both Marseille and Lyon.

Rennes
On 16 July 2019, Morel left Lyon upon the ending of his contract and joined Rennes on a one-year deal.

Lorient
In summer 2020, Morel rejoined his boyhood club FC Lorient on a free transfer, signing a one-year deal with an option for another year. Lorient are newly promoted to Ligue 1 after finishing top at the end of the 2019–20 Ligue 2 season. He left Lorient on 26 August 2022, one of four players to do so that day, alongside Houboulang Mendes, Fabien Lemoine and Jérôme Hergault.

International career
On 28 October 2018, Morel announced that he would represent the Madagascar national team, the birth country of his father. He made his debut for Madagascar on 18 November 2018 in an Africa Cup of Nations qualifier against Sudan.

He played at 2019 Africa Cup of Nations when Madagascar made a sensational advance to the quarterfinals.

Career statistics

Scores and results list Madagascar's goal tally first, score column indicates score after each Morel goal.

Honours
Marseille
Trophée des Champions: 2011
Coupe de la Ligue: 2011–12

References

External links
Career stats at lfp.fr

1984 births
Living people
Sportspeople from Lorient
French footballers
People with acquired Malagasy citizenship
Malagasy footballers
French sportspeople of Malagasy descent
Malagasy people of French descent
Madagascar international footballers
Association football fullbacks
FC Lorient players
Olympique de Marseille players
Olympique Lyonnais players
Stade Rennais F.C. players
Ligue 1 players
Ligue 2 players
Footballers from Brittany
2019 Africa Cup of Nations players